Theresa Breen (born December 4, 1965) is a Canadian curler from Bedford, Nova Scotia. She currently skips her own team out of Halifax, Nova Scotia.

Curling career 
Breen was the long-time third for the Anne Merklinger rink in the 1990s. As a member of that team, she would win four provincial championships, and would play in four Scott Tournament of Hearts, representing Ontario. Her first Hearts appearance was in 1993, where the team won a bronze medal, after losing to Manitoba's Maureen Bonar in the semi-final. The team returned to the Hearts the following year, but missed the playoffs after winning just 4 round robin games. The team returned to the Hearts in 1998, making it all the way to the final before losing to Alberta's Cathy Borst to settle for silver. Breen's final Hearts appearance was in 2000 where the team once again made it all the way to the final before losing, this time to British Columbia's Kelley Law rink.

In 1996, Breen won an Ontario Mixed title playing third with Rich Moffatt. The team went on to lose the final of the 1996 Canadian Mixed Curling Championship. In 1997, as a member of the Merklinger rink, Breen played in the 1997 Canadian Olympic Curling Trials, just missing the playoffs.

Breen moved to Nova Scotia in the mid-2000s, and would join the Mary-Anne Arsenault rink for the 2008-09 season, throwing lead rocks. Breen would play in her first and only Grand Slam event that season, the 2008 Sobeys Slam, where they lost in the quarterfinal. Breen would go on to form her own team after the season.

In 2011, Breen won the Nova Scotia Mixed title playing lead for Paul Flemming.

In 2014, Breen returned to play on the World Curling Tour. Breen would skip a team consisting of Tanya Hilliard, Jocelyn Adams and Amanda Simpson. In 2015, Breen won her first WCT event as a skip, the Appleton Rum Cashspiel.

In 2017, Breen and her team qualified for the Home Hardware Road to the Roar in Summerside, PEI, where they upset Tracy Fleury in their opening match. And finished 3-3.

Personal life
Breen is currently the chair of the Sandra Schmirler Foundation. She works as the Senior Regional Manager for TD Wealth Financial Planning. She is married to Barry Frame.

References

External links

Living people
1965 births
Curlers from Ontario
Curlers from Nova Scotia
People from Bedford, Nova Scotia
Sportspeople from Kingston, Ontario
Sportspeople from Halifax, Nova Scotia
Canadian women curlers
Canada Cup (curling) participants